Huiloapan de Cuauhtémoc, Veracruz, Mexico, is a municipality located in central zone of the State of Veracruz, about 180 km from state capital Xalapa. It has a surface area of 23.85 km2. 

The municipality of Huiloapan de Cuauhtémoc is delimited to the north by Rafael Delgado, Nogales and Tlilapan, to the east by San Andrés Tenejapan and Soteapan, to the south by Atlahuilco and Soledad Atzompa, and to the west by Nogales and Isla.

It primarily produces maize and coffee.

In December, a celebration takes place within the town in honor of La Purísima Concepción, Patron of the town.

The weather in Huiloapan de Cuauhtémoc is cold all year with rains in summer and autumn.

References

External links 
  Municipal Official webpage
  Municipal Official Information

Municipalities of Veracruz